Interstate 1 may refer to either any of three unconnected Interstate Highways in the United States:

 Interstate A-1 in Alaska
 Interstate H-1 in Hawaii
 Interstate PRI-1 in Puerto Rico

1